Stuart Rigby Ambrose (born 11 January 1943) is a former English first-class cricketer.  Ambrose was a left-handed batsman.  He was born in Watford, Hertfordshire.

Ambrose made his debut for Hertfordshire in the 1969 Minor Counties Championship against Cambridgeshire.  Ambrose played Minor counties cricket for Hertfordshire from 1969 to 1981, which included 48 Minor Counties Championship matches.  He made his List A debut against Durham in the 1974 Gillette Cup.  He made 3 further List A appearances for the county, the last coming against Northamptonshire in the 1976 Gillette Cup.  In his 4 List A matches, he scored 66 runs at an average of 16.50, with a high score of 27.

References

External links

1943 births
Living people
Sportspeople from Watford
English cricketers
Hertfordshire cricketers